Hector Authier (November 4, 1881 – April 14, 1971) was a Canadian politician, lawyer and news reporter/announcer.

Background

He was born on November 4, 1881 in Ange-Gardien, Quebec.

Mayor

He served as the first Mayor of Amos, Quebec in 1914, for a one-year term.

Member of the legislature

Authier won a by-election in 1923 and became the Liberal Member of the Legislative Assembly (MLA) for the provincial district of Abitibi.  He was re-elected in the 1927, 1931 and 1935 elections.

He served as Deputy Speaker of the House from 1935 to 1936 and was a Member of the Cabinet as the Minister of Colonization by 1936.  He did not run for re-election in the 1936 election.

Federal politics

He was elected to the House of Commons of Canada in 1940 as a Member of the Liberal Party representing the riding of Chapleau.

Death

He died on April 14, 1971 in Montreal.

The municipalities of Authier and Authier-Nord are named after him.

Footnotes

1881 births
1971 deaths
Liberal Party of Canada MPs
Mayors of Amos, Quebec
Members of the House of Commons of Canada from Quebec
Quebec Liberal Party MNAs
Vice Presidents of the National Assembly of Quebec
Université Laval alumni